Horana Royal College (also known as Royal College, Horana) is a national school in Horana, Sri Lanka.

The college was established in 1978 and became a national school in 2000.

In May 2016 President Maithripala Sirisena officially opened the school's new auditorium.

Sports
Horana Royal College plays its annual cricket match (Big Match) with Siri Piyarathana College, Padukka. It is also called the Battle of Gold and Purple.

See also
 List of schools in Western Province, Sri Lanka

References

1970 establishments in Ceylon
Boys' schools in Sri Lanka
Educational institutions established in 1970
National schools in Sri Lanka
Buildings and structures in Horana
Schools in Kalutara District